The 1989 Cal State Fullerton Titans football team represented California State University, Fullerton as a member of the Big West Conference during the 1989 NCAA Division I-A football season. Led by tenth-year head coach Gene Murphy, Cal State Fullerton compiled an overall record of 6–4–1 with a mark of 5–2 in conference play, tying for second place in the Big West. By winning the last three games, the Titans finished over the .500 mark for the first time since 1985. The team played home games at Santa Ana Stadium in Santa Ana, California.

Schedule

Team players in the NFL
The following Cal State Fullerton players were selected in the 1990 NFL Draft.

Notes

References

Cal State Fullerton
Cal State Fullerton Titans football seasons
Cal State Fullerton Titans football